Adeílson Pereira de Mello (born 7 October 1985 in Nova União), known simply as Adeílson, is a Brazilian professional football striker who plays for Al Dhaid.

Career 
Adeílson previously played for Guarani and Ipatinga.

In January 2009 he signed for Nice in a -year deal and on 8 July 2009 Fluminense have loaned the forward from French side OGC Nice.

After two years out on loan, he returned to Nice but left France to join Criciúma Esporte Clube on 9 July 2011.

References

External links
 
 CBF 
 
 
 

Brazilian footballers
Brazilian expatriate footballers
Guarani FC players
Tombense Futebol Clube players
Ipatinga Futebol Clube players
Fluminense FC players
OGC Nice players
FC Istres players
Criciúma Esporte Clube players
América Futebol Clube (MG) players
Clube Náutico Capibaribe players
Campeonato Brasileiro Série A players
Ligue 1 players
Ligue 2 players
Ajman Club players
Al Urooba Club players
Al Shabab Al Arabi Club Dubai players
Dibba FC players
Al Dhaid SC players
Expatriate footballers in France
Expatriate footballers in the United Arab Emirates
Brazilian expatriate sportspeople in the United Arab Emirates
1985 births
Living people
Association football forwards
UAE First Division League players
UAE Pro League players
Esporte Clube Mamoré players